Miguel Centeno may refer to:
 Miguel Centeno (footballer), Mexican football goalkeeper
 Miguel A. Centeno, American sociologist